Petersburg Old Town Historic District is a national historic district located at Petersburg, Virginia. The district includes 174 contributing buildings located in the oldest section of Petersburg. It includes a varied collection of late 18th- through 20th-century architecture.  Notable buildings include the Strachan-Harrison house (mid- to late-18th century), the John F. May house (c. 1810), South Side Railroad Depot (c. 1853), High Street United Methodist Church (1844, 1897), Church of Christ (1925), and the Powell Manufacturing Co.  Located in the district and separately listed are the Appomattox Iron Works, City Market, Exchange Building, Farmers' Bank and Nathaniel Friend House.

It was listed on the National Register of Historic Places in 1980, with a boundary increase in 2008.

References

Historic districts on the National Register of Historic Places in Virginia
Buildings and structures in Petersburg, Virginia
National Register of Historic Places in Petersburg, Virginia